Forensic entomology has three sub-fields: urban, stored product and medico-criminal entomologies. This article focuses on medico-criminal entomology and how DNA is analyzed with various blood-feeding insects.

Forensic entomology can be an important aspect for law enforcement. With the magnitude of information that can be gathered, investigators can more accurately determine time of death, location, how long a body has been in a specific area, if it has been moved, and other important factors.

Blood meal extraction 

To extract a blood meal from the abdomen of an insect to isolate and analyze DNA, the insect must first be killed by placing it in 96% ethanol. The killed insect can be stored at -20 °C until analysis. When it is time for analysis, the DNA must then be extracted by dissecting the posterior end of the abdomen and collecting 25 mg of tissue. The cut in the abdomen should be made with a razor blade as close to the posterior as possible to avoid the stomach. Using a DNA extraction kit, the DNA is extracted from the tissue. If the DNA is mixed with samples from more than one individual, it is separated using a species specific primer. Once extracted and isolated, the DNA sample goes through a polymerase chain reaction (PCR), is amplified and identified.

PCR works by analyzing species specific mitochondrial DNA. PCR is currently the most commonly used method of species identification. This results from the fact that it is very sensitive in that it requires only a small amount of biological material, and can also utilize material that is not particularly fresh. The sample can be frozen and stored while still remaining usable for later PCR.
 
DNA requires one hour to reach the abdomen of an insect, so DNA can be amplified one to forty-four hours after an insect feeds. Some research suggests that the source of a blood meal can be determined up to two months post feeding.

To amplify DNA, it must first be denatured by exposing it to a 95 °C temperature for one minute, followed by thirty cycles of thirty-second 95 °C exposures. Then denatured DNA is mixed with a specific primer. A chromatograph is conducted on 2% agarose gel, stained, and viewed with UV fluorescence. The DNA is identified by looking for genome specific repetitive elements and by comparing it with known examples.

Haematophagous insects of forensic importance 

Humans are constantly fed on by haematophagous (blood feeding) insects. The ingested blood can be recovered and used to identify the person from which it was taken. Bite marks and reactions to bites can be used to place a person in an area where those insects are found.

Order Diptera 
The following among the flies (Diptera) have been utilized:
 Mosquitoes, Family Culicidae
 Due to erratic feeding habits, mosquitoes can provide valuable DNA evidence. Multiplex PCR enables reliable identification of bitten individuals from just one mosquito, even few days after taking a blood-meal. The insects would need to be collected as soon as possible due to the insect's high mobility, digestion of consumed blood (degradation of DNA) and repeated feeding, although dead specimens are also potentially valuable source of evidence DNA. Research is centered on the mosquito due its widespread presence and affinity for feeding on humans. 
 Biting midges, Family Ceratopogonidae
 Tsetse flies, Family Glossinidae
 Sheep keds, Family Hippoboscidae
 Stable and horn flies, Family Muscidae
 Sand flies, Family Psychodidae, Subfamily Phlebotominae
 Snipe flies, Family Rhagionidae
 Black flies, Family Simuliidae
 Horse flies, Family Tabanidae

Order Siphonaptera 

Listed here are fleas commonly encountered by humans that could potentially be used for DNA identification.

 Sticktight and chigoe flea, Family Hectopsyllidae (formerly Tungidae)
 Cat flea (Ctenocephalides felis)
 Northern rat flea (Nosopsyllus fasciatus)
 Human flea (Pulex irritans)
 Oriental rat flea (Xenopsylla cheopis)

Order Hemiptera 
Bedbug (Cimex lectularius)

Cimex lectularius is an obligate parasite of humans. Testing a sample of a residence's bed bug population and screening for bites could reveal possible recent visitors to the structure, as they have been observed to feed approximately once a week in temperate conditions. A recent re-emergence of bedbug populations in North America as well as growing interest in the field of forensics may prove bedbugs to be useful investigative tools. Recent studies have revealed that human DNA can be recovered from bed bugs for up to 60 days after feeding, thus demonstrating the potential use of this insect in forensic entomology 

Assassin bugs, Family Reduviidae

Order Phthiraptera 

Lice can be indicators of contact with another person. Many species closely associated with humans can be easily transferred between individuals. DNA identification of multiple individuals using blood meals from body and head lice has been demonstrated in laboratory settings.

Suborder Anoplura 
Head louse (Pediculus humanus capitis)
Body louse (Pediculus humanus humanus)
Pubic louse (Pthirus pubis)

Other Arthropods

Order Ixodida 

Due to the low probability of a tick detaching and falling to the ground at the scene of the crime, these may not be highly useful regardless of the large amount of blood and lymph they ingest. However, should an engorged tick be found in an area of interest, it would likely contain sufficient genetic material for identification.

Analysis of collected DNA 
DNA identification of species can be a useful tool in forensic entomology. Although it does not replace conventional identification of species through visual identification, it can be used to differentiate between two species of very similar or identical physical and behavioral characteristics.
A thorough identification of the species through conventional methods is needed before an attempt at DNA analysis. This DNA can be obtained from practically any part of the insect, including the body, leg, setae, antennae, etc. There are about one million species described in the world and many more that have still not been identified. A project termed "the barcode of life" was launched by Dr. Paul D. N. Hebert, where he identified a gene that is used in cellular respiration by all species, but is different in every species. This difference in sequence can help entomologists easily identify two similar species.

DNA sequencing is basically done in three steps: polymerase chain reaction (PCR), followed by a sequencing reaction, then gel electrophoresis. PCR is a step that cleaves the long chain of chromosomes into much shorter and workable pieces. These pieces are used as patterns to create a set of fragments. These fragments are different in length from each other by one base which is helpful in identification. Those sets of fragments are then separated by gel electrophoresis. This process uses electricity to separate DNA fragments by size as they move through a gel matrix. With the presence of an electric current the negative DNA strand marches toward the positive pole of the current. The smaller DNA fragments move through the gel pores much more easily/faster than larger molecules. At the bottom of the gel the fragments go through a laser beam that emits a distinct color according to the base that passes through.

References 

Forensic entomology
Forensic entomology